After Tonight is a 1933 American pre-Code World War I spy film directed by George Archainbaud and starring Constance Bennett and Gilbert Roland. The studio considered firing Bennett after the film lost $100,000 at the box office.

Plot
With the outbreak of World War I, a young woman is unable to purchase a train ticket from Luxembourg to Austria. However, Rudolph "Rudy" Ritter is attracted to her and gets her aboard a train to Bern, Switzerland. Later, when the train is stopped short of their destination, she slips away while he goes in search of a car. He does not even know her name.

Rudy turns out to be a captain in the Austrian Ministry of War assigned to deal with Russian spies, particularly the very successful K-14. He gets a lead when a secret message is intercepted; it contains information about a newly improved flamethrower. Rudy is assigned to Major Lieber, the man in charge of the unit developing the weapon.

Rudy is delighted when Lieber introduces him to nurse Karen Schöntag, his former traveling companion. Rudy sees Karen every night, and the pair fall in love. However, Karen is actually K-14. She narrowly escapes being caught by Rudy and his men, then is brought in for questioning when she goes to a certain staircase that Rudy knows is being used by the Russians to transfer messages. Rudy refuses to believe she is a spy and does not even search her. Major Lieber, however, notices something odd about one of the books she had with her; one page has been freshly torn out (the one with an invisible message).

Faced with the mounting evidence, Rudy sets a trap. He has Russian-speaking Private Muller sent to K-14's hospital masquerading as a prisoner of war. Muller gives K-14 the Russian recognition signal (two circles) and passes her a message, ordering her to meet an agent at a deserted house at nine o'clock that night. K-14 is suspicious, but feels she must go. Her contact insists on taking her there. After she incriminates herself to "Russian" agent Lehan, Rudy is forced to arrest her. K-14's associate shoots Rudy and knocks out Lehan. He has to drag K-14 away from the wounded Rudy, who also urges her to flee.

After the war ends, the two meet by chance at a Swiss train station. This time, Rudy does not let her get away.

Cast

Production
Working titles for the film were "Free Lady", "The Woman Spy" and "Without Glory".  In 1934, Daily Variety reported that a plagiarism suit had been filed against the film by Baroness Carla Jenssen, who claimed that the story of the film wa an unauthorized version of her own story, "She Spys", but the outcome of the suit is unknown.

Reception
Mordaunt Hall was unimpressed with the film, writing in The New York Times that it "taxes one's credulity" and that Roland's performance was "hardly satisfactory", though he thought "Miss Bennett does her work as well as it is possible in the circumstances."

RKO lost $100,000 on the film.

References

External links
 
 
 
 

1933 films
1933 romantic drama films
1930s spy films
American romantic drama films
American spy films
American black-and-white films
Films directed by George Archainbaud
Films set in Austria
Films set in Switzerland
Western Front (World War I) films
World War I spy films
Films with screenplays by Jane Murfin
1930s American films